Anin is a subdistrict of Wawer, in south-east Warsaw.

References

Neighbourhoods of Wawer

Wawer